The Big East–Big 12 Battle was an annual NCAA Division I men's college basketball series in which teams from the Big East Conference faced the teams of the Big 12 Conference. The series was played annually for four years, from 2019 through 2022.

In 2019, when the Big East consisted of 10 teams, all 10 Big East teams faced one of the 10 Big 12 teams. The Big East expanded to 11 teams when UConn moved from the American Athletic Conference to the Big East for the 2020–2021 season, so from 2020 through 2022 ten of the 11 Big East teams faced one of the Big 12 teams and one Big East team did not participate.

Unlike in the Big 12/SEC Challenge, the teams in the Big East-Big 12 Battle did not face each other all on the same day. Instead, they played each other over the span of as much as two-and-a-half weeks, with games scheduled in late November and December in some years and solely in December in others. The Big East won the first series 8–2 in 2019, and the other three series ended in a tie between the two conferences.

Four games of the 2020 series were canceled due to the COVID-19 pandemic.

Big 12 home games aired on ESPN, ESPN2, ESPNU, ESPN+, and ABC, while Big East home games aired on Fox and Fox Sports 1.

Conference and team records

Big East Conference (1–0–3)

Big 12 Conference (0–1–3)

Results

2019 Big East (8–2)

2020 Tied (3–3)

2021 Tied (5–5)

2022 Tied (5–5)

References

2019 establishments in the United States 
Big East Conference men's basketball 
Big 12 Conference men's basketball 
Recurring sporting events established in 2019 
College men's basketball competitions in the United States
College basketball competitions